Prober may refer to: someone who asks questions

Technology
Electron beam prober
Laser voltage prober
Time resolved photon emission prober
Wafer prober

Surname
Suzanne Mary Prober